Edward Ferrers (c. 1573 – will proved 1639) was an English politician who sat in the House of Commons from 1610 to 1611.

Ferrers was the eldest son of Roger Ferrers of Fiddlington. In 1610, Ferrers was elected as  the first Member of Parliament for Tewkesbury when it received its franchise. 
 
Ferrers was the brother of William Ferrers (died 1625) who was a benefactor of the free grammar school.

References

1570s births
1639 deaths
English MPs 1604–1611
People from Tewkesbury
Place of birth missing